The 2013–14 season of F.B.C. Unione Venezia's was their first season in Lega Pro Prima Divisione after promotion from the Seconda Divisione in 2012–13.

Players

Transfers

In

Out

Squad

Staff
Head coach
  Alessandro Dal Canto
Assistant coach
  Marco Zanchi
Fitness coach
  Fabio Munzone
Goalkeeper coach
  Giorgio Sterchele

Profiles and statistics

Legend:

Starting XI
These are the most used starting players (all competitions) in the most used formation throughout the complete season. Last updated on 6 October 2013.

Matches

Lega Pro Prima Divisione

Coppa Italia

Coppa Italia Lega Pro

Championship statistics

Results by round

Results summary

References

Venezia
Venezia F.C. seasons